"You're Not There" is a song by Danish soul-pop band Lukas Graham, released by Copenhagen Records on 13 May 2016 in Scandinavia, Germany, Austria, and Switzerland, as the fourth single from their second studio album, Lukas Graham (Blue Album) (2015).

The song is about frontman Lukas Forchhammer’s father who died in 2012.

Track listing

Live performances 
The song was performed during the 2016 MTV Europe Music Awards in a medley featuring the group's biggest hit "7 Years". On November 9, 2016 they performed the song on the American talk show Late Night with Seth Meyers.

Chart performance

Weekly charts

Year-end charts

Release history

References

2015 songs
2016 singles
Songs written by Morten Ristorp
Songs written by Lukas Forchhammer
Songs written by Stefan Forrest
Lukas Graham songs
Commemoration songs
Copenhagen Records singles
Warner Records singles